Jost Schömann-Finck (born 8 October 1982, in Zell) is a German rower.

References
 
 

1982 births
Living people
Olympic rowers of Germany
Rowers at the 2008 Summer Olympics
World Rowing Championships medalists for Germany
German male rowers